Ganging Up on the Sun is the fifth studio album by the rock band Guster. It was released on June 20, 2006. The first single, "One Man Wrecking Machine", was released in late 2005 and its follow-up, "Satellite", in March 2006. It is Guster's second studio album with Joe Pisapia, his first as a full member. The title comes from a line in the song "Manifest Destiny": "The moon and stars are ganging up on the sun".

The album is Guster's most successful release to date, entering the Billboard 200 albums chart at number 25, topping Keep It Together'''s entry at number 35 in 2003. It won Album of the Year (Major) at the Boston Music Awards in 2006.

On May 5, 2021 the band announced a digital re-release of the album in an expanded form, with 24 tracks. This coincided with "Emily Ivory" being released for the first time, 15 years after it was teased in the studio documentary Joe's Place. The expanded edition of the album includes Emily Ivory, 4 b-sides previously released on "Satellite EP", Sorority Tears and On My Own, both of which were unofficially released on The Pasty Tapes'', 2 cover songs, 2 demos, and a remix.

Track listing
 "Lightning Rod" – 2:55
 "Satellite" – 4:34
 "Manifest Destiny" – 3:02
 "One Man Wrecking Machine" – 4:14
 "The Captain" – 3:26
 "The New Underground" – 2:52
 "Ruby Falls" – 7:04
 "C'mon" – 3:51
 "Empire State" – 4:59
 "Dear Valentine" – 4:34
 "The Beginning of the End" – 2:52
 "Hang On" – 4:32

2021 Expanded Edition
 "Lightning Rod" – 2:55
 "Satellite" – 4:34
 "Manifest Destiny" – 3:02
 "One Man Wrecking Machine" – 4:14
 "The Captain" – 3:26
 "The New Underground" – 2:52
 "Ruby Falls" – 7:04
 "C'mon" – 3:51
 "Empire State" – 4:59
 "Dear Valentine" – 4:34
 "The Beginning of the End" – 2:52
 "Hang On" – 4:32
 "Emily Ivory"
 "Rise & Shine"
 "Timothy Leary"
 "G Major"
 "I'm Through"
 "Sorority Tears"
 "On My Own"
 "The Sun Shines Down On Me (Daniel Johnston Cover)"
 "This Wheel's on Fire (The Band Cover)"
 "Hang On (Demo)"
 "One Man Wrecking Machine (Demo)"
 "Satellite [The Astronauts Remix]"

Charts

References

2006 albums
Guster albums
Reprise Records albums
Albums produced by Ron Aniello